Alfred Wilhelm Steinke (June 6, 1881 – May 3, 1945) was a German ice hockey player. Steinke played on the Germany men's national ice hockey team at the 1928 Winter Olympics. He became one of the oldest male hockey players to compete in the Olympics at the age of 48. He was killed in action in World War II.

References

External links

Olympic profile

1881 births
1945 deaths
German ice hockey players
Ice hockey people from Berlin
Ice hockey players at the 1928 Winter Olympics
Olympic ice hockey players of Germany
German military personnel killed in World War II
Military personnel from Berlin